Die Trying is the second novel in the Jack Reacher series written by Lee Child. It was published in 1998 by Bantam Press in the UK and by Putnam in the US. It is written in the third person.

Plot

While in Chicago, former military police officer Jack Reacher is helping a young woman with an injured leg with her dry cleaning when they're captured at gunpoint by three men and thrown into a car, then transferred into a van and driven cross country. On the way, Reacher learns the woman is an FBI agent named Holly Johnson, though she doesn't tell him she's the daughter of the Chairman of the Joint Chiefs of Staff nor goddaughter of the President, having been accused of being the beneficiary of nepotism all her life.

Meanwhile, Holly's fellow agents search for her. Security footage leaves Reacher as the prime suspect, and his mentor, General Leon Garber, is brought in to help, though he insists Reacher would never do such a thing. The Chicago office where Holly worked take charge, with only agent in charge McGrath and two others, Milosevic and Brogan involved. At one point, they manage to put an APB out on the van, but get the wrong van due to a transfer of vehicles.

After Reacher fails to take advantage of an opportunity to escape during the night, Holly insists that he let her handle things. However, she ends up owing him when, during another stay, one of the kidnappers, Peter Bell, tries to rape her. Reacher breaks free of his restraints, kills Bell, hides his body, and re-restrains himself before the others become suspicious. Holly finally and reluctantly accepts his help after this.

Reacher and Holly finally arrive at their destination; a mountain community that's home to a radical military sect wishing to secede from the US. Holly, intended by leader Beau Borken to be used as leverage to make her father agree to his demands, is placed in an upstairs room of an abandoned county courthouse, whose walls are supposedly filled with dynamite. She meets Jackson, an FBI agent working undercover, who offers to help her escape, but she refuses to leave without Reacher.

Meanwhile, Reacher, after witnessing Borken execute Loder, the leader of the kidnappers, for multiple failures, is shown around the camp with the intent of sending him back to the States with information on the militia's credibility. However, word soon reaches Borken of Bell's murder, and Reacher is put on trial. Learning that he'll be executed, Holly escapes her room and convinces Borken to commute his sentence after he proves his worth in a shooting match.

During the punishment, Reacher and Holly are forced to bury the caught Jackson's corpse, and Reacher suspects something big is about to happen. Meanwhile, the FBI figures out where the militia is. When the President, fearing political fallout from a bloodbath, refuses to authorize an attack, McGrath and his men go rogue, setting up camp near the community. That night, Reacher sneaks out of his cabin and into an abandoned mine, where he finds trucks carrying missiles.

The next morning, as he returns to the camp, Reacher rescues McGrath, who was caught trying to break into the camp, proving his innocence. The two realize that Brogan and Milosevic are moles working for Borken for money. They stalk the camp to save Holly, killing Brogan in the process. Borken drags Holly out on national TV and tries to force her father to give in to his demands. With a sniper rifle stolen from the ammo cabin, Reacher shoots him dead. Milosevic takes Holly hostage, but Holly manages to kill him.

As the FBI round up the remaining militia members and demolish the camp, Reacher discovers that Holly's cabin isn't actually filled with dynamite and realizes that Borken sent Stevie, the last kidnapper in a truck filled with it to San Francisco, where he plans to detonate in the middle of a crowd celebrating the Fourth of July. Everyone gets in a helicopter and Reacher manages to shoot and destroy the truck on time. Learning that Holly and McGrath are in a relationship, Reacher sadly says goodbye to her and is left to hitchhike down a highway.

Awards and nominations
 1999 WH Smith Thumping Good Read Award winner.

See also
 Northwest Territorial Imperative

References

External links
 Die Trying information page on Lee Child's official website.

1998 British novels
British thriller novels
Jack Reacher books
Novels about terrorism
Novels set in Chicago
Third-person narrative novels
Bantam Press books
G. P. Putnam's Sons books